Jefferson Hospital for Neuroscience is a hospital in Center City Philadelphia, affiliated with Thomas Jefferson University and Thomas Jefferson University Hospital in Philadelphia. The hospital focuses on treating brain-related diseases and disorders. It is the only hospital of its kind in the Philadelphia area.

The hospital annually treats the largest combined volume of brain tumors, spinal cord injuries, aneurysms, and areteriovenous malformations in the Philadelphia metropolitan region.

Jefferson Hospital for Neuroscience was the first in the Delaware Valley to offer a number of technologies including:
 Fractionated stereotactic radiosurgery (also known as stereotactic radiotherapy)
 Gamma Knife®
 Shaped Beam Surgery™
 Minimally invasive neurosurgery utilizing a robotically controlled microscope
 NeuRx DPS™, an FDA-approved device that helps individuals with certain types of spinal cord injuries breathe on their own again

The hospital also established Jefferson Expert Teleconsulting (JET), the first technology of its kind in the region. It is a university-based high-tech mobile robotic teleconsulting system.

Departments and services
Jefferson Hospital for Neuroscience provides medical services across more than 20 specialized centers, programs, departments and divisions.
 Acute Stroke Center
 Brain Aneurysm and AVM center
 Brain Tumor Center
 Comprehensive Concussion Center
 Comprehensive Epilepsy Center
 Comprehensive Multiple Sclerosis Center
 Geriatric Psychiatry Center
 Headache Center
 Jefferson Expert Teleconsulting (JET)
 Mechanical Circulatory Support Program
 Medical Oncology
 Minimally Invasive Cranial Base Surgery Center
 Movement Disorders Program
 Neurological Surgery
 Neurology
 Neuroradiology-Head and Neck Imaging
 Ophthalmology
 Radiation Oncology
 Rehabilitation Medicine
 Spine Program
 Stereotactic Radiosurgery Program

References

External links
 Thomas Jefferson University Hospital
 Thomas Jefferson University

Hospitals in Philadelphia
Teaching hospitals in Pennsylvania
Market East, Philadelphia
Neuroscience research centers in the United States
Research institutes in Pennsylvania